Royal Oak is a city in Oakland County in the U.S. state of Michigan. As of the 2020 census, the city had a population of 58,211.

Royal Oak is located along the Woodward Corridor, and is served by Interstate 75 and Interstate 696. The city has one of the largest downtowns in Detroit's suburbs, and is also home to much of the Detroit Zoo, with portions extending into neighboring Huntington Woods.

History
Early Europeans in this area near Fort Detroit in the 18th century were mostly French. Some traded with the Sauk, Huron, and other Native Americans in the area. After defeating France in the French and Indian War/Seven Years' War, Great Britain obtained New France, including Fort Detroit and environs. Initially part of British Indian Territory, the area became part of the reorganized Province of Quebec in 1774. After the American Revolutionary War, Michigan was transferred to the United States in three phases: 1796, Lower Peninsula; 1818, Upper Peninsula; 1827, Drummond Island, becoming the Northwest Territory, and later, Indiana Territory.

Royal Oak was named in 1819, during one of the surveying expeditions led by Territorial Governor Lewis Cass. A large oak tree at this small settlement reminded Cass of the story of the Royal Oak, where King Charles II of England, Scotland and Ireland hid to escape capture by the Roundheads after the Battle of Worcester, so he chose that name for the settlement.

Royal Oak was not incorporated as a village until 1891. It was reincorporated a city in 1921.

20th century to present
Royal Oak developed as a suburb of Detroit in the early 20th century, following Detroit's booming growth as a result of industrialization and its auto industry.

The Royal Oak Farmers Market opened as a truck market, at the corner of 4th and Troy streets, on October 14, 1925, as a cooperative venture between the then-new City of Royal Oak and Oakland County, Michigan. There were still numerous farmers in the county. The present structure, at the corner of 11 Mile Road and Troy Street, is adjacent to the 44th District Court. It was erected in the spring of 1927 and dedicated July 1 of that year.

In the 1920s, Father Charles Coughlin, a Canadian Catholic priest who relocated to Detroit, became the founding pastor of the Shrine of the Little Flower, now a prominent landmark in the city. Through his ministry, he raised funds to build the present limestone church complex and tower. Initially he broadcast religious speeches from this site.

During the 1930s, his broadcasts became more political. He initially supported President Franklin D. Roosevelt, then opposed him and promoted the causes of the fascist leaders of Germany and Italy. The Roosevelt administration closed down his radio operation after the outbreak of World War II, with support from the Catholic hierarchy. Coughlin had developed national political influence and had an increasingly anti-semitic message, at a time when Jewish people were being severely persecuted in Germany.

The downtown originally had a typical mixture of small-scale retail and trade to serve the city of Royal Oak. With the development of the highway system in the postwar period, it lost business to suburban malls. Since the late 1990s and early 2000s, however, Royal Oak's downtown has developed as an entertainment and nightlife destination. A number of large condominiums and lofts have been built in the area, increasing the density of the downtown population. In 2022, the Royal Oak City Council approved the demolition of the historic Main Art Theater, once a symbol of moviegoers in the area.

Geography

Royal Oak developed around a river, the Red Run. Vinsetta Boulevard was built skirting a source branch of the Red Run for its median. In the 1930s, Vinsetta's entire median, along with the river and all but the tops of the bridges for the crossing streets were filled in as part of a WPA project during the Great Depression. During 1967–8, the rest of the river in Oakland County was buried within a six-foot drain pipe.

Extensive tree-planting has taken place since the 1930s, leading to the town being nicknamed "The City of Trees", although recent increased developments have caused controversy about the maintenance of the city's urban forest.

Demographics

2020 census
As of the census of 2020, there were 58,211 people and 28,971 households in the city. The racial makeup of the city was 86.1% White, 5.6% African American, 0.1% Native American, 3.7% Asian American, and 1.9% from two or more races. Hispanic or Latino of any race were 4.5% of the population.

5.4% of residents were under the age of 5, 15.2% of residents were under the age of 18, and 14.1% were 65 years of age or older. The gender makeup of the city was 51.0% male and 49.0% female.

2010 census
As of the census of 2010, there were 57,236 people, 28,063 households, and 13,394 families living in the city. The racial makeup of the city was 90.7% White, 4.3% African American, 0.3% Native American, 2.4% Asian American, 0.4% from other races, and 1.9% from two or more races. Hispanic or Latino of any race were 2.3% of the population.

There were 28,063 households, of which 20.0% had children under the age of 18 living with them, 36.7% were married couples living together, 8.1% had a female householder with no husband present, 3.0% had a male householder with no wife present, and 52.3% were non-families. 41.4% of all households were made up of individuals, and 10.7% had someone living alone who was 65 years of age or older. The average household size was 2.03 and the average family size was 2.82.

The median age in the city was 37.8 years. 16.7% of residents were under the age of 18; 7.6% were between the ages of 18 and 24; 35.9% were from 25 to 44; 26.8% were from 45 to 64; and 13.1% were 65 years of age or older. The gender makeup of the city was 49.0% male and 51.0% female.

2000 census
As of the census of 2000, there were 60,062 people, 28,880 households, and 14,440 families living in the city. The racial makeup of the city was 94.80% White, 1.54% African American, 0.26% Native American, 1.56% Asian, 0.05% Pacific Islander, 0.38% from other races, and 1.40% from two or more races. Hispanic or Latino of any race were 1.30% of the population.

There were 28,880 households, out of which 20.4% had children under the age of 18 living with them, 39.9% were married couples living together, 7.5% had a female householder with no husband present, and 50.0% were non-families. 40.8% of all households were made up of individuals, and 11.6% had someone living alone who was 65 years of age or older. The average household size was 2.06 and the average family size was 2.86.

In the city, the population was spread out, with 17.8% under the age of 18, 7.5% from 18 to 24, 38.8% from 25 to 44, 21.0% from 45 to 64, and 14.9% who were 65 years of age or older. The median age was 37 years. For every 100 females, there were 95.3 males. For every 100 females age 18 and over, there were 92.6 males.

The median income for a household in the city was $52,252, and the median income for a family was $68,109. Males had a median income of $50,562 versus $36,392 for females. The per capita income for the city was $30,990. About 2.0% of families and 4.3% of the population were below the poverty line, including 3.4% of those under age 18 and 5.5% of those age 65 or over.

Government

Royal Oak has a Council–manager government. It is governed by a city commission consisting of a mayor and six commission members. The city commission appoints a city manager, who manages the day-to-day operations of the city.

Royal Oak has a below-average crime rate, similar to that of nearby middle-class communities, such as Berkley and Madison Heights. Larceny-theft was the most common crime, making up 66.7% of all crimes in the city. Five known murders have been committed since 2000, one in 2004, one in 2005, one in 2010, and two in 2011.

In 1991, Thomas McIlvane, a postal worker, killed five people in Royal Oak's post office, after being fired from the Postal Service for "insubordination." This incident helped to popularize the term "going postal."

Royal Oak's police department has 79 sworn officers and 25 civilian personnel. The department employs community policing techniques.

Royal Oak has a full-time fire department that operates three stations strategically located around the city to minimize response time to incidents. The ROFD staffs three engines, a ladder truck, and two ALS ambulances daily and is a member of the OAKWAY mutual aid consortium.

Economy

Royal Oak developed initially as a suburb after Detroit boomed as a major industrial city. The predominantly white residents of Detroit began to move to the suburbs for newer housing, and to separate themselves from a burgeoning African American population, in a process referred to as white flight. It had a compact, traditional street-side shopping district, which runs along Main Street and Washington Avenue downtown. During the 2000s, this area was redeveloped with numerous new businesses, and is now considered a trendy, upscale, urban-chic district, featuring restaurants, shopping, and entertainment. A number of mixed-use high-rise developments have been constructed — mostly condo "lofts" with retail and office space on the lower levels.

Points of interest include the Detroit Zoo, a major regional tourist attraction, the William Beaumont Hospital, the Royal Oak Music Theatre, the Baldwin Theatre, Mark Ridley's Comedy Castle, a location of Emagine Entertainment, and shops, cafes, and restaurants.

The National Arbor Day Foundation has awarded Royal Oak the distinction of "Tree City USA" every year since 1976 as a result of the city's commitment to tree planting and preservation.

The Gilda Radner Hereditary Cancer Program is a foundation set up by Detroit-area native Gilda Radner, who is known for her work as a comedian of Saturday Night Live. In 1998 the Program created a free cancer support community for people with cancer, their families, and friends. Gilda's Club Metro Detroit operates a three-story non-residential house in Royal Oak. It has served more than 3,000 members for social and emotional support through a variety of activities.

Wm. Sullivan & Son Funeral Directors is operated business for over a 100 years founded in 1906 by Funeral Director William Sullivan, the business for many years was located on Main Street in Royal Oak, first at the northwest corner of Main and Second Street, and a short time later at the northeast corner of Main and Third Streets. A second location was acquired at Hall Road, Utica, MI. They provide ethical standards and meaningful funeral service to the residents of Royal Oak and Utica.

Education
The city is served by Royal Oak Neighborhood Schools. Private K-12 education is also offered by Shrine of the Little Flower Catholic Church while nearby St. Mary's offers K-8 instruction. A branch of Oakland Community College is located in the city and a new location of Baker College is nearing the end of construction.

A portion of land in the city is zoned to Berkley Public Schools.

In recent years Royal Oak has begun to consolidate its public schools in response to a decline in enrollment levels compared to the baby boom era. In 2006, the city's two public high schools, George A. Dondero High School and Clarence M. Kimball High School, were combined into a new Royal Oak High School. Beginning in 2007, the city's two middle schools were combined into one school, Royal Oak Middle School, in the former Dondero building. The number of elementary schools was reduced to six. Some parents protested the planned closure and demolition of Longfellow and Whittier elementary schools. They were seeking to have them considered for historic district recognition by way of signed petition. Despite their efforts, both schools and a number of other former elementary schools were demolished in the fall of 2007.

The Royal Oak school system gained brief notoriety for an incident following the Trump election. Some middle schoolers chanted "build that wall". A student video of the incident was widely shared on Facebook, attracting more than 4 million views within 24 hours. A week later a noose was found in the 8th grade boys bathroom at the middle school. The student who had placed the noose in the bathroom was removed from the school shortly afterward.

St. Dennis School of the Roman Catholic Archdiocese of Detroit was formerly in Royal Oak. It closed in 2011.

Transportation

Numbered highways

  runs north–south along the city's east side. 
 runs east–west along the city's south side.
  (formerly designated US 10 and also known as Woodward Avenue) runs generally southeast–northwest along the city's west side. 
 Five numbered east–west mile roads run through Royal Oak.

Rail and bus
 Class one freight rail service is provided by Canadian National Railway (CN).
 Suburban Mobility Authority for Regional Transportation (SMART) operates local and regional bus transit.

Historical
 Commuter rail service, provided by Grand Trunk Western Railroad (GTW) and later Southeastern Michigan Transportation Authority (SEMTA) from Pontiac to downtown Detroit, with two stops in Royal Oak, ran until October 17, 1983.
 The Saginaw Trail was a footpath established by the Sauk tribe between Detroit and Saginaw. In Royal Oak present-day Main Street and Crooks Road were developed along the historic path.

Culture

Downtown Royal Oak features a wide assortment of nightlife venues, including the Royal Oak Music Theatre and the Baldwin Theatre. Mark Ridley's Comedy Castle, a comedy club, was an early venue for performers such as Tim Allen and Dave Coulier. Allen's connections to Royal Oak would later in his career be alluded to in the sitcom Home Improvement as the protagonist's (played by Allen) place of residence.

Royal Oak encompasses a major span of the Woodward Dream Cruise. The city sponsors ancillary events around the Cruise. It is the site of the Detroit Zoo, one of the region's leading tourist attractions.

In December 2009 it was announced that the Arts, Beats and Eats festival would be moved from Pontiac to Royal Oak.

In addition to The Detroit News and Detroit Free Press, regional newspapers serving all of southeast Michigan, the city is served by the Daily Tribune, The Oakland Press, the Royal Oak Review, and The Mirror.

Religion
Previously Royal Oak had St. Dennis Catholic Church of the Detroit Archdiocese; in 2012 it was in the process of merging into St. Vincent Ferrer Church in Madison Heights. This real estate was later redeveloped as a location of regional grocery story chain Meijer.

Royal Oak is home to the National Shrine of the Little Flower Basilica, which was declared a national shrine in 1998 by the United States Conference of Catholic Bishops. Later in 2014, Pope Francis granted the National Shrine of the Little Flower the honorary title of ‘Minor Basilica’.

Notable people
 Alexandra Aldridge, figure skater, was born in Royal Oak
 Mary Barra, chairman and CEO of General Motors Company, was born in Royal Oak
 Bruce Campbell, film and television actor, was born in Royal Oak
 Meryl Davis, figure skater, winner of gold medal at 2014 Winter Olympic Games in Sochi, silver medalist in 2010
 Pete Dawkins, winner of college football's 1958 Heisman Trophy, military officer, and political candidate, was born in Royal Oak
 Marie Donigan, landscape architect and former member of the Michigan House of Representatives
 Terry Duerod, University of Detroit and NBA basketball player, was born in Royal Oak
 Mona Hanna-Attisha, pediatrician and Flint Water Crisis whistleblower, was raised in Royal Oak
 Kirk Ferentz, football head coach for University of Iowa (1999–present), was born in Royal Oak
 Dean Fertita, rock musician
 Bill Freehan, Major League Baseball catcher who was an 11x MLB All Star, 5x gold glove winner, and 1968 World Series champion. Spent all of his 15 seasons playing with the Detroit Tigers, grew up in Royal Oak.
 Glenn Frey, founding member of rock group the Eagles, was raised in Royal Oak and attended Dondero High School
 Christopher George, actor, star of films and TV series The Rat Patrol, was born in Royal Oak
 Jason Grilli, Major League Baseball pitcher, was born in Royal Oak
 Judith Guest, author of Ordinary People, lived and attended school in Royal Oak
 David Hahn—the "Radioactive Boy Scout" was born in Royal Oak.
 Tom Hayden, was born in Royal Oak and attended Dondero High School. He is best known as an author of the Port Huron Statement, and he stood for trial in the Chicago Seven case. He was at one time married to Jane Fonda.
 Jack Kevorkian, practiced physician-assisted suicide in Royal Oak
 Keegan-Michael Key, film and television actor, attended Shrine Catholic High School in Royal Oak
 Torey Krug, NHL defenseman, was born in Royal Oak
 T. J. Lang, pro football player for Green Bay Packers, Detroit Lions, was born in Royal Oak
 Sam Raimi, film director, producer, writer, actor, was born in Royal Oak
 Ivan Raimi, physician and screenwriter, was born in Royal Oak
 Kim Rancourt, Rock Musician
 Terrell Ransom Jr., actor
 Elisabeth Robinson, author of The True and Outstanding Adventures of the Hunt Sisters
 Sebastian Sauve, Fashion model
 Andrew Dost American musician, singer and is member of the indie rock band Fun.
 Chris Savino, animator, creator of the Nickelodeon animated series The Loud House.
 Frank Dennis Saylor IV, judge , was born in Royal Oak
 Jim Seymour, wide receiver for Notre Dame and Chicago Bears, attended Shrine Catholic High School in Royal Oak
 Brady Smith, NFL defensive end 1996–2005, was born in Royal Oak
 Marshall Thompson, actor, star of films and television, died in Royal Oak
 Al Watrous, golf professional
 Charlie White, ice dancer, winner of gold medal at 2014 Winter Olympic Games in Sochi, silver medalist in 2010

See also

 Woodward Corridor
Architecture of metropolitan Detroit
Detroit Zoo
Tourism in metropolitan Detroit
1970 Memorial Park riot

References

External links

 Royal Oak Chamber of Commerce
 City of Royal Oak
 Downtown Royal Oak
 Royal Oak Public Library
 City Guide for Royal Oak
 

 
Metro Detroit
Populated places established in 1891
Cities in Oakland County, Michigan
1891 establishments in Michigan